Luillys Pérez (born December 23, 1990) is a Venezuelan Greco-Roman wrestler. He competed in the men's Greco-Roman 98 kg event at the 2016 Summer Olympics, in which he was eliminated in the round of 16 by Ghasem Rezaei.

In 2019, he competed in the men's Greco-Roman 97 kg event at the World Wrestling Championships held in Nur-Sultan, Kazakhstan.

He won the gold medal in his event at the 2022 South American Games held in Asunción, Paraguay.

References

External links
 

1990 births
Living people
Venezuelan male sport wrestlers
Olympic wrestlers of Venezuela
Wrestlers at the 2016 Summer Olympics
Pan American Games medalists in wrestling
Pan American Games bronze medalists for Venezuela
Wrestlers at the 2015 Pan American Games
Wrestlers at the 2019 Pan American Games
Medalists at the 2015 Pan American Games
Medalists at the 2019 Pan American Games
Pan American Wrestling Championships medalists
South American Games medalists in wrestling
South American Games gold medalists for Venezuela
Competitors at the 2022 South American Games
21st-century Venezuelan people